Arakapı is a village in the Kızıltepe District of Mardin Province in Turkey. The village is populated by Arabs and had a population of 28 in 2021.

References 

Villages in Kızıltepe District
Arab settlements in Mardin Province